Arapaho is a town in, and the county seat of, Custer County, Oklahoma, United States. The population was 796 at the 2010 census, a 6.4 percent increase from the figure of 748 in 2000. The town lies long U.S. Route 183 and is named for the Arapaho Native American tribe.

History
The area containing present Arapaho was surveyed by federally-contracted surveyors in 1891, prior to the Cheyenne-Arapaho land opening on April 19, 1892. A US post office was set up for the proposed community on March 23, 1892.

On April 19, 1892, the expected inrush of settlers did materialize; by sundown some 400 claims had been posted. The first town newspaper was issued 10 days later, titled The Arapahoe Arrow (by the end of the year its name had changed to The Arapahoe Bee).

Several Protestant church groups had been organized during the first few years. By 1894 the county courthouse and a school had been built. A lending library was in operation by May 1904.

The Oklahoma Territorial Legislature approved the incorporation on March 2, 1905 (Council Bill #80). The county courthouse had been lost in an 1896 fire, and was not replaced until 1935, built with Public Works Administration funds. It was enlarged in 1985.

Geography
Arapaho is located at  (35.577014, -98.962370). This places it along U.S. Route 183, north of Clinton.  

Climate

Public education
The public education system of the town is combined with that of nearby Butler. The Arapaho-Butler Public School System operates an elementary school (pre K-6th grade) and a high school (7th-12th grade). Both schools are located in Arapaho, adjacent to each other on north 12th Avenue. The two schools had a combined enrollment of 280 in 2000.

Demographics

As of the 2010 census, there were 796 people living in the town. The population density was 1,067.4 people per square mile (412.6/km2). There were 289 housing units at an average density of 426 per square mile (165/km2). The racial makeup of the town was 87.03% White, 1.20% African American, 5.88% Native American, 1.07% Asian, 2.41% from other races, and 2.41% from two or more races. Hispanic or Latino of any race were 5.61% of the population.

There were 265 households, out of which 41.9% had children under the age of 18 living with them, 60.0% were married couples living together, 12.1% had a female householder with no husband present, and 22.3% were non-families. 21.1% of all households were made up of individuals, and 11.7% had someone living alone who was 65 years of age or older. The average household size was 2.66 and the average family size was 3.07.

In the town, the population was spread out, with 29.1% under the age of 18, 7.9% from 18 to 24, 28.6% from 25 to 44, 23.5% from 45 to 64, and 10.8% who were 65 years of age or older. The median age was 35 years. For every 100 females, there were 97.9 males. For every 100 females age 18 and over, there were 97.8 males.

The median income for a household in the town was $34,271, and the median income for a family was $36,339. Males had a median income of $26,375 versus $20,972 for females. The per capita income for the town was $14,645. About 13.7% of families and 16.1% of the population were below the poverty line, including 24.3% of those under age 18 and 3.1% of those age 65 or over.

References

External links
 Encyclopedia of Oklahoma History and Culture - Arapaho

Towns in Custer County, Oklahoma
Towns in Oklahoma
County seats in Oklahoma